Butterberg is the name of several mountains and hills:

 in Germany:
 Butterberg (Bad Harzburg) (308 m), in the Harz, near Bad Harzburg, Goslar district, Lower Saxony
 Butterberg (Ilfeld) (539 m), in the Harz, near Ilfeld, Nordhausen district, Thuringia
 Butterberg (Ilsenburg) (279 m), in the Harz, near Ilsenburg, Harz district, Saxony-Anhalt
 Butterberg (Elmshorn), near Elmshorn, Pinneberg district, Schleswig-Holstein
 Butterberg (Groß Pankow), Groß Pankow (Prignitz), Prignitz district, Brandenburg
 Butterberg (Passee), near Passee, Nordwestmecklenburg district, Mecklenburg-Vorpommern
 Butterberg (Bischofswerda) (385 m), near Bischofswerda, Bautzen district, Saxony
 Butterberg (Schmölln-Putzkau) (388 m), near Tröbigau, Bautzen district, Saxony
 Butterberg (Waltersdorf), near Waltersdorf, Görlitz district, Saxony 
 in Poland:
 Butterberg (Elbing Heights), in the Elbing Heights, Woiwodschaft Ermland-Masuren
 Villages:
 the German name for the Czech village of Máselnik in the borough of Dubá